Capsella may refer to:
 Capsella (bivalve), a mollusc genus in the family Donacidae
 Capsella (plant), a plant genus in the family Brassicaceae

See also
 Capsela, a construction toy